Freziera caloneura is a species of plant in the Pentaphylacaceae family. It is found in Bolivia and Peru.

References

caloneura
Vulnerable plants
Taxonomy articles created by Polbot